Peter Gibson Neil (1898 – 1976) was a Scottish footballer who played in the English Football League for Birmingham. He played mainly as an outside right.

Neil was born in Airdrie but spent much of his life in Cambuslang, both in Lanarkshire. With his teenage years interrupted by World War I, he began his career with local junior side Cambuslang Rangers at the end of the conflict and soon moved on East Fife, then playing in the Central League, and was in the team that won the Scottish Qualifying Cup. He joined Birmingham from East Fife in April 1921, and made his debut in the First Division on 17 September 1921 in a 1–1 draw at home to Everton. He made four more appearances during the 1921–22 season, on each occasion deputising for Bill Harvey.

Neil returned to Scotland in September 1922 to join Heart of Midlothian of Scottish Division One. After less than a season in Edinburgh he switched to second tier Bo'ness, and at the end of 1923 transferred to Alloa Athletic, his final club before retiring.

References

1898 births
1976 deaths
Footballers from Airdrie, North Lanarkshire
Sportspeople from Cambuslang
Scottish footballers
Association football outside forwards
Cambuslang Rangers F.C. players
East Fife F.C. players
Birmingham City F.C. players
Heart of Midlothian F.C. players
Bo'ness F.C. players
Alloa Athletic F.C. players
English Football League players
Scottish Football League players
Scottish Junior Football Association players
Date of birth missing
Footballers from South Lanarkshire